George Balleine can refer to:

 George Orange Balleine (1842–1906), Dean of Jersey
 George Reginald Balleine (1873–1966), historian